Aleksandr Alekseyevich Balakhonov (born 26 June 2002) is a Russian football player. He plays for FC Forte Taganrog.

Club career
He made his debut for the main squad of FC Rotor Volgograd on 21 October 2020 in a Russian Cup game against PFC Krylia Sovetov Samara.

References

External links
 
 

2002 births
Living people
Russian footballers
Association football defenders
FC Rotor Volgograd players